Propyleneimine (or propylene imine) is the organic compound with the formula CH3CH(NH)CH2.  It is a secondary amine and the smallest chiral aziridine (ring containing C2N).  It is a flammable colorless liquid.  Its derivatives, copolymers and oligomers, are of commercial interest.

Uses
This chemical is used in the paper, textile, rubber and pharmaceutical industries. Propyleneimine is also used in making paint.

The top global producers of this specialty chemical include DuPont, Mitsubishi Chemical Holdings Corporation, Sigma-Aldrich, Dixie Chemical Company, J and K Scientific, Apollo Scientific, Mitsui Chemicals.

The compound is also of  interest for the synthesis of dendrimers, a process that exploits the tendency of aziridines to undergo ring-opening reactions.

Health Effects
NIOSH considers propyleneimine a potential occupational carcinogen.

The Dixie Chemical Company facility in the Bayport Industrial District, Pasadena, Texas, has been noted for releasing toxic air pollution.

References

Aziridines